Toofan Aur Deeya (Storm and Lamp) is a 1956 Bollywood film directed by Prabhat Kumar and starring Satish Vyas, Nanda, Rajendra Kumar, Vatsala Deshmukh, Shanta Kumari, Krishna Kumar, Keshavrao Date, and Ulhas.

Plot 

Summary of Toofan Aur Diya 

The film depicts a period in our society, not so long past when the postcard was a  trusted and cheap means of communication and the cycle the most common mode of commuting; when people were sensitive to the sufferings of others in their neighborhood and faith was the rule rather than the exception in social relationships.

 The film relates the inspiring story of a boy Sadanand and his sister Nandini who endeavor to live with honor after their father(poet  Milind Madhav) died in penury. Many people who were uprooted from familiar surroundings following the partition of the country and had to endure numerous struggles to survive, rebuild their lives, and bring up their families in new surroundings will be able to identify themselves with the travails of Sadanand and his sister.

The boy, aptly called Sadanand, is ever cheerful and active and assumes the responsibility of his sister and their sick mother. The boy sacrifices his studies to do several odd jobs -selling vegetables, newspapers, carrying luggage at the railway station, etc.- while his simple and sensitive elder sister Nandini chips in with preparing and feeding lunch to a few regulars who conduct themselves more like family members than customers. The regulars include young Satish Sharma (called  Masterji by Sadanand) a college student with scholarly inclinations. A mutual affection develops between Masterji and Nandini which is a regular topic of playful banter between the siblings. 

The film opens with Masterji being presented with a gold medal for his literary essay on the poetic works of the late Milind Madhav.  Masterji shares the happy tidings with Chachiji (widow of the deceased poet )who is moved to tears seeing on the gold medal the image of her late husband who never got recognition for his works and had to battle with poverty throughout his life.

Sometime thereafter, Masterji having completed his course, decides to take up employment nearer to his native village so as to help his father who has run into debt for educating him. Chachiji tells him that her end is nearing and requests him to marry Nandini so that she can die peacefully. However, Masterji is not ready to marry as he has three unmarried younger sisters at home and takes leave wishing well for Nandini's marriage into a good family.

When their mother dies, the siblings decide to move away from painful memories associated with the familiar surroundings and sell away their meager possessions including their father's collection of books and Sadanand's beloved ("pyari") cycle to settle their debts. They leave the town and take shelter in a remote temple with the permission of a Sanyasi who meditates there in seclusion. Assured that her sister is safe with the holy man around, Sadanand goes daily to the nearby town selling vegetable door to door to earn a living. One day, he comes across Alkaji, a dancer whose luggage he had earlier carried at the railway station. She takes an instant liking for him as she sees the likeness of her own son in Sadanand. She assures him that she will be the first customer of whatever wares he sells and asks him to visit her regularly. One day when Sadanand asks why her son is not staying with her, the dancer confides that she sends money regularly for his upkeep in a different town and if she keeps him with her, she will have to live in poverty as she will not be able to pursue her dancing business. This upsets Sadanand who walks away saying he will come back only when her son comes to live with her.

Knowing the mutual affection between Nandini and Masterji, Sadanand writes regularly to Masterji to keep him informed of their welfare. However, the course of life does not run smoothly for them as  Nandini who has been long complaining of watering in her eyes, becomes blind. Sadanand is devastated with grief and guilt when he learns this. He holds himself responsible for not arranging timely medical treatment for her and runs to jump into the river. The holy man saves him in time and reprimands him for trying to run away from the problem. He assures him that Nandini will recover her sight with treatment as she was not born blind. With monetary help from the kindly dancer, Sadanand gets the operation done and Nandini recovers her eyesight. 

While they are still rejoicing over this, news comes that Masterji is bedridden with typhoid in a nearby town and there is no one to take care of him. Sadanand rushes there to learn that his condition is serious and he needs urgent treatment with some costly medicines. With self-belief and faith in God, he toils day and night and arranges the medicines, and Masterji recovers. 

Masterji and Nandini get married in the temple and after a tearful departure of the newlywed couple, Sadanand bursts out crying that he is now left all alone. The holy man assures him that he is not alone as his sense of purpose, selfless dedication, and determination have compelled a Sanyasi to willingly give up his “Sanyas“. He will now take care of Sadanand so that he completes his studies as he foresees that Sadanand is destined to achieve great accomplishments for the country in the future. The film ends with a grateful and beaming Sadanand hugging the holy man.

While Sadanand is away to take care of Masterji, Alkaji, the dancer goes to the temple looking for him. Learning that he is away, she asks the Sanyasi to inform Sadanand that he has helped a woman gone astray to mend her ways and reform and she is leaving the town to live with her son.

The lyrics by Bharat Vyas and music by Vasant Desai only add to the inspirational and sublime tenor of the story. The film's title song (nirbal ki ladai balwaan) soulfully rendered by the inimitable Manna De, recurs several times during the film highlighting the exigent situation the protagonist is faced with. The song will continue to ring in your ears long after the film has ended conveying the sublime message of hope and belief that with determination, unstinting efforts, and faith in God, no adversity is impossible to overcome.

Cast 
 Satish Vyas
 Nanda
 Rajendra Kumar

Songs
 "Ye Kahani Hai" (aka Nirbal se ladaayee) - Manna Dey
 "Muraliya Baje Ri" - Lata Mangeshkar
 "Aankhon Mein Aankhen" - Shamshad Begum
 "Piya The Kahan Gayo" - Lata
 "Giridhari Mhane" - Lata
 "Aaya Re Bhajiwala" - Geeta Dutt
 "Dil Tumne Liya" - Shamshad
 "Meri Choti Si Bahen" - Geeta, Lata
 "Meri Aan" - Geeta

References

External links 
 

1956 films
1950s Hindi-language films
Films scored by Vasant Desai
Indian drama films
1956 drama films
Indian black-and-white films